REO Town is a district in Lansing, Michigan, United States, located south of downtown. The neighborhood is bordered by West Malcolm X Street to the north; South Cedar Street BL I-96 to the east; West Mount Hope Avenue to the south; and Townsend Street, the Grand River, and South Martin Luther King Jr. Boulevard to the west.  

Considered the birthplace of the commercial automobile in the US, REO Town is named after Ransom Eli Olds, an automobile pioneer, for whom both the Oldsmobile and REO brands were named. 

In addition to a commercial corridor along South Washington Avenue, REO Town includes three neighborhoods: Fabulous Acres, Moores Park, and River Point.

History
The REO Motor Car Company began producing automobiles along South Washington Avenue in REO Town in 1905, ending production in 1975.

The REO Town Commercial Association was formed in 2003 to encourage businesses and residential growth in the area.

In July 2010 the Lansing Board of Water & Light announced plans to construct a $182 million natural gas-powered electric and steam generation plant along Washington Avenue in REO Town.  The eight-story facility moved 180 jobs upon its opening in January 2013.  Plans also call for the renovation and reuse of the former Grand Trunk railroad station.  Construction of the new power station began in May 2011.  The cogeneration power plant became operational on July 1, 2013.

In August 2010 the former Deluxe Inn was transformed into an outdoor urban graffiti art exhibit.  The planned event attracted approximately 25 artists.  The defunct motel, at the north end of REO Town, was demolished in September 2010 and is currently a large grassy lot.

In August 2011 Lansing received a $326,100 federal transportation grant to help pay for a $2.1 million streetscape project along Washington Avenue in REO Town.

Economy 
REO Town has several large and small employers, including Board of Water and Light, the Record Lounge, Saddleback BBQ, REO Town Pub, Blue Owl Coffee, Michigan Creative, Soulful Earth Herbals, Woke Mind Body Studio, New Horizons, Studio Intrigue Architects, Good Truckin' Diner, Quality Dairy, Riverview Church, O'Leary Paint Company, Lansing Sanitary Supply Company and LEAP.

REO Town's largest employer is still the automotive industry with the Lansing Grand River Assembly plant employing approximately 2,500 hourly and salary employees.

REO Town is host to many vintage/second hand stores including REO Town Marketplace, Vintage Junkies, Community Finery, Thriftique, Blue Onyx Thirft, Jean Jean Vintage, Jo's Unique Boutique and St. Vincent De Paul. 

REO Town's hair and nail services include Cuttin Up Barber Shop and the Artisan Company.

Arts and culture 

REO Town has several arts and culture events throughout the year. Art Attack, an event organized by the REO Town Commercial Association, celebrates art, live music and food. Arts Night Out is a celebration of art and culture that is put on by the Arts Council of Greater Lansing.

The Robin Theatre provides a space for poetry, live music and theater performances. REO Town also features recording studios Elm Street Recording and REO Town Recording.

Art & Craft Beerfest is a celebration of art, beer and music. It is held during the mid-winter break between other area beerfests. The festival features 20 beers from Traverse City's Right Brain Brewing Company, 10 ciders from Blake’s Hard Cider and a variety of Michigan wines. Lansing Beer Fest is now hosted on the third Saturday of June, and has been held since 2012. 

On June 23, 2018, REO Town hosted the Three Stacks Music Festival, featuring Against Me!, Murder by Death, Pup, mewithoutyou, Screaming Females, Camp Cove, Petal, Oceanator, City Mouse, Worn Spirit, Stefanie Haapala, Ness Lake, and Secret Forte.

Founded in 2004, REACH Studio Art Center offers free and low-cost art classes for local Lansing youth and teens. Wheel House Studios opened in September 2018, offering classes and private lessons on wheel throwing geared towards adults.

References

External links
 http://www.reotown.com/
 REO Town at city-data.com

Geography of Lansing, Michigan
Tourist attractions in Lansing, Michigan
Historic districts in Michigan